Fredrick Pyfer was an American politician. He served as the twelfth mayor of Lancaster, Pennsylvania from 1871 to 1873.

References

Mayors of Lancaster, Pennsylvania
Year of birth missing
Year of death missing